Shahur or Shahoor may refer to:
 Shahur, alternate name of Rashg-e Shavur
 Shahur, alternate name of Sadd-e Shavur
 Shahur or Shahoor, a village in Sarwakai Tehsil, South Waziristan, Pakistan